Turban training centre or turban tying centre or dastar academy  are training-cum-tying institutes opened by professionals, who train Sikhs, in tying dastar on their heads. They also tie dastar for those people who do not know how to tie turban, charging fees. Their regular clients include industrialists, businessmen, doctors, engineers, transporters and students.

Turban training centers have opened mostly in main cities of Punjab, such as Ludhiana, Jalandhar, Bathinda, Patiala, Amritsar, Chamkaur, Moga. and nowadays in some Delhi and Haryana cities too. Baptized male Sikhs cover their hair with a turban, while baptized female Sikhs may do so. However, the trend of wearing turbans declined due to fashion, glamor and youngsters preferring to keep cut hair and a clean shaved face. Regional Punjabi film stars and Punjabi music icons such as Inderjit Nikku, Diljit Dosanjh, Lehmber Hussainpuri, Ravinder Grewal, Ammy Virk, Ranjit Bawa, Sidhu Moose Wala, Tarsem Jassar, Kulbir Jhinjher, Surjit Bindrakhia, Himmat Sandhu who always wear Pag in their films and music videos, have inspired Sikh youths to wear turbans with various new styles.

Several styles of Sikh turban are popular, including Patiala Shahi, Morni Dastar, Pochvi Dastar, Barnala Shahi, Amritsar Shahi, Vatta Vaali and Dumalla/Dhamalla for baptised Sikhs. Dabbi Vaale Parne is a casual turban mostly worn by farmers in villages and has been popularized by Diljit Dosanjh, Nikku, Ravinder Grewal and now popularized in cities as well. Barring these, a simple turban with the shape and size of individual liking is tied. The length of cloth of any of the above styles varies according to personal suiting.

Some centres also provide training in Dumalla style,  which is basic attire for all baptized Sikhs and can also teach Parna a casual turban to all category of Sikhs. Many Sabat Surat Turban Trainers/Tyers have inspired Sabat Surat Sikh Youth and other clean shaven males to wear Dastar to keep hair back and reject caps. Many turban trainers offer training camps in Non-Punjab States like Delhi, Maharashtra etc.

Technique 
Turban trainers mostly prefer common full "Voil" or "F-74 Malmal" cloth and prefer double over single size and the turban is slightly made wet before they start the tying procedure and before tying Dastar a Patka or Keski is tied on head to cover hair first and head base is set in a proper way by tying the hair backwards

Retailers 
Some turban centres only sell turban cloth such as full Voil, Rubia or Malmal cloth but do not give professional training you may find retailers in all major markets in all major cities in Punjab.

See also
 Salai (needle)
 Thatha

References

Sikh culture
Personal care and service occupations
Punjab, India